Öre River (Swedish: Öreälven or Öre älv) is a river in Sweden.

References

Rivers of Västerbotten County